This is a List of GP3 Series drivers who have made at least one race start in the GP3 Series.

By name

By racing license

Footnotes

References

External links
 Teams and drivers of the 2013 GP3 Series

GP3 Series
GP3 Series drivers